Events from the year 1688 in Ireland.

Incumbent
Monarch: James II (until 23 December), deposed

Events 
Dame Mary Joseph Butler establishes a Benedictine house in Dublin.
November 16 – exiled Irish Catholic widow "Goody" Ann Glover becomes the last person hanged in Boston, Massachusetts, as a witch.
December 7 – start of the siege of Derry. The city gates are locked against the forces of King James II by apprentice boys.

Births 
Approximate date – Esther Vanhomrigh, Jonathan Swift's "Vanessa" (d. 1723)

Deaths 
March 15 – Peter Valesius Walsh, politician (b. c. 1618)
July 21 – James Butler, 1st Duke of Ormonde, Anglo-Irish statesman and soldier (b. 1610)

References 

 
1680s in Ireland
Ireland
Years of the 17th century in Ireland